Olga Pilipova (born 9 September 1983) is an athlete from Kazakhstan.  She competes in archery.  Pilipova represented Kazakhstan at the 2004 Summer Olympics.  She placed 48th in the women's individual ranking round with a 72-arrow score of 616.  In the first round of elimination, she faced 17th-ranked Naomi Folkard of Great Britain.  Pilipova lost 139-128 in the 18-arrow match, placing 57th overall in women's individual archery. She was born in Ural'sk, Kazakh SSR.

References 

1983 births
Living people
Archers at the 2004 Summer Olympics
Kazakhstani female archers
Olympic archers of Kazakhstan
Archers at the 2002 Asian Games
Archers at the 2010 Asian Games
Asian Games competitors for Kazakhstan
People from Oral, Kazakhstan
21st-century Kazakhstani women